Bubble hair deformity is damage of the hair shaft, resulting in patches of short weak brittle hair, that feels rough.

Definition
Bubble hair deformity is damage of the hair shaft, resulting in patches of short weak brittle hair, that feels rough.

Cause
It is typically caused by chemicals and heat; temperatures greater than 125 °C on wet hair, such as with the use of hair dryers, hair straighteners and curling tongs.

Mechanism
Bubble hair is characterized by rows of bubbles seen microscopically within localized areas of the brittle hair. These air-filled spaces occur in the cortex of the hair shaft that correspond to the breakdown of keratin and local air expansion triggered by hot water passing through the shaft. There may be an inherited predisposition. It can be associated with trichorrhexis nodosa and trichoptilosis.

Diagnosis
Diagnosis can be confirmed by microscopy.

Prevention
Avoiding excessive heat and chemicals can prevent the condition.

Epidemiology
Bubble hair is more common in females.

See also 
 List of cutaneous conditions

References

Conditions of the skin appendages
Human hair
Hair diseases